Flax tempuensis is a moth of the family Erebidae first described by Michael Fibiger in 2011. It is found in Indonesia (northern Sumatra).

The wingspan is about 10.5 mm. The forewings are beige and the fringes are light brown. There is a black-brown quadrangular patch in the upper medial area, with a ventro-basal small black dot. The base of the costa is black brown, subapically with small black dots. The crosslines are indistinct brown, except for the brown subterminal line and terminal line indicated by black-brown interveinal dots. The hindwings are grey with an indistinct discal spot. The underside of the forewings is unicolorous light brown and the underside of the hindwings is grey with a discal spot.

References

Micronoctuini
Moths described in 2011
Taxa named by Michael Fibiger